The Kingdom of Cyprus, as an offshoot of the Kingdom of Jerusalem, maintained many of the same offices, such as: seneschal, constable, marshal, admiral, Chamberlain, and chancellor.  

The Officers of the Kingdom of Cyprus from its founding were:

Seneschal
 Guy de Lusignan (c. 1195), son of Amalric I of Cyprus
 Aimery de Rivet (1197–1210)
 Baldwin of Ibelin (1246–1267)
 Robert de Cresque (1269)
 Balian of Ibelin (1286–1302)
 Philip of Ibelin (1302–1318), brother of prec.
 Guy of Ibelin (1318–after 1334?), son of prec.
 James of Lusignan (1369)

Constable

Amalric of Lusignan (before 1194)
John of Lusignan
Baldwin of Bethsan (c. 1195)
Guy of Beirut
Walter of Beirut (c. 1206), lord of Caesarea
John of Ibelin (c. 1227-1229), called the Old Lord of Beirut
John of Ibelin (c. 1247), son of prec.
Guy of Ibelin (c. 1250), brother of prec.
Baldwin of Ibelin, son of prec.
Balian of Ibelin, (c. 1276), son of John of Arsuf
John of Lusignan (before 1284)
Guy of Lusignan (c. 1291) son of Hugh III
Philip of Ibelin (c. 1302), son of Baldwin, seneschal of Cyprus
Aimery of Lusignan (c. 1303) brother of Guy.
Hugh of Lusignan (c. 1318), son of Guy
Honfroy of Montfort (c. before 1326)
Guy of Lusignan, (c. 1336–1338), son of Hugh IV 
Peter of Lusignan (c. soon after 1343, assumed), son of Hugh IV
James of Lusignan (c. after 1369), son of Hugh IV
Philip of Lusignan, son of prec.
Guy of Lusignan, brother of prec.

Marshal

Hugh Martin (1194–1196)
Renaud de Soissons (1210–1217)
Adam de Gaures of Antioch
John of Antioch (1247), son of prec.
Anceau
William de Canet (1269)
Simon de Montolif
Thomas de Montolif (1328)
Daniël van de Merwede (1361)

Admiral
Johann of Brunswick-Grubenhagen (died 11 June 1414)
Garceran Suárez de los Cernadilla (1432–after 1458)

Chamberlain

Amaury de Bethsan (1218–1220)
Geoffrey le Tor (1247)
Philip de Cassie (1269)
Walter of Antioch (1286)

Chancellor

Peter of Angoulême, under Guy de Lusignan
Alan (1195–1201), archdeacon of Lydda and archbishop of Nicosia
Ralph (1217–1220), archdeacon of Nicosia
Bonvassal d'Aude (1231–1248), canon of Nicosia
Peter (1269–1288), bishop of Paphos
Henry de Gibelet (1291–1330), archdeacon of Nicosia

Butler
The office of butler was created in 1328.

See also
Officers of the Kingdom of Jerusalem
Officers of the Principality of Antioch
Officers of the County of Tripoli
Officers of the County of Edessa

References
Edbury, Peter W. The Kingdom of Cyprus and the Crusades, 1191–1374. Cambridge University Press, 1993.
La Monte, John L. Feudal Monarchy in the Latin Kingdom of Jerusalem 1100 to 1291. Medieval Academy of America, 1932. Cf. pp. 252–60.

Kingdom of Cyprus
Cyprus history-related lists
Lists of office-holders in Cyprus